In a physical or geochemical system, a solvus is a line (binary system) or surface (ternary system) on a phase diagram which separates a homogeneous solid solution from a field of several phases which may form by exsolution or incongruent melting. The line determines a solid solubility limit which changes as a function of temperature. It is a locus of points on the equilibrium diagram. 
An example is the formation of perthite when an alkali feldspar is cooled down. It defines the limit of solid solubility in an equilibrium diagram.

See also
Miscibility gap

References 

Geochemistry
Petrology
Materials science